"It's Over Now" is a song by the American synthpop band Cause&Effect. It was released as a single in 1994 and reached number 67 on the Billboard Hot 100 and number 7 on the Billboard Modern Rock chart in August 1994.

Track listing

12" maxi-single
Catalog #:72445 14138 1

Side A
 It's Over Now (It's Alright) (Aborigine Mix) (7:02)
 It's Over Now (It's Alright) (Combustion Mix) (6:21)

Side B
 It's Over Now (It's Alright) (Outback Dub) (6:09)
 It's Over Now (It's Alright) (Mood Mix) (5:03)

CD maxi-single #1

Catalog #:72445 14130 2

 It's Over Now (It's Alright) (7-inch Mix) (3:55)
 It's Over Now (It's Alright) (Combustion Mix) (6:21)
 Shakespeare's Sublimation (Liquid State Mix) (5:41)
 It's Over Now (It's Alright) (Condensation Mix) (6:23)
 Words To Hold On To (1/4 Mix) (4:19)

CD maxi-single #2

Catalog #:72445 14145 2

 It's Over Now (It's Alright) (7-inch Mix) (3:55)
 It's Over Now (It's Alright) (Combustion Mix) (6:21)
 Shakespeare's Sublimation (Liquid State Mix) (5:41)
 It's Over Now (It's Alright) (Condensation Mix) (6:23)
 Words To Hold On To (1/4 Mix) (4:19)
 It's Over Now (It's Alright) (Aborigine Mix) (7:02)

Chart positions

References 

1994 singles
1994 songs
Cause and Effect (band) songs
Bertelsmann Music Group singles